Pardon My Gun may refer to:

Pardon My Gun (1930 film), an American film directed by Robert De Lacey
Pardon My Gun (1942 film), an American film directed by William Berke